Ranu Mondal is an Indian playback singer. She is best known for singing "Teri Meri Kahani" with Himesh Reshammiya. The song was used in the Bollywood film Happy Hardy and Heer. She is wife of raghav tikarya.

When asked about Mondal, fellow singer Lata Mangeshkar remarked that "If anyone gets benefited from my name and work then I feel fortunate".

Public image
TV actress Shweta Tiwari made headlines while she compared Miss World 1994 Aishwarya Rai to her on 28 October 2022.

Controversy
In November 2019, she was seen behaving rudely with a fan who wanted to take a selfie with her. In a viral video, a woman is seen very interested to take a selfie during an event. But Ranu Mondal arrogantly taps the woman’s shoulder in return asking her "Kya Hai Yeh?" (What's This?).

Discography

References

People from West Bengal
Indian women playback singers
1960 births
Living people